Hatcher is a surname. Notable people with the surname include:

Allen Hatcher (born 1944), U.S. mathematician
Anna Granville Hatcher (1905–1978), U.S. linguist
Edwin Starr (born Charles Edwin Hatcher, 1942–2003), U.S. soul singer
Chris Hatcher (disambiguation), several people
Claude A. Hatcher (1876–1933), U.S. pharmacist and soft drink developer (R.C. Cola)
Derian Hatcher (born 1972), U.S. hockey player
Gene Hatcher (born 1959), U.S. boxer
Harlan Hatcher (1898–1998), American academic who served as the eighth President of the University of Michigan from 1951 to 1967
Jade Hatcher (born 1990), Australian dancer
Jason Hatcher (born 1982), U.S football player
Jeffrey Hatcher, U.S. playwright
John Bell Hatcher (1861–1904), U.S. paleontologist, discoverer of Triceratops
Julian Hatcher (1888–1963), U.S. general, firearms expert and author
Kevin Hatcher (born 1966), U.S. hockey player
Layne Hatcher (born 1999), American football player
Leigh Hatcher (born 1955), Australian journalist and news presenter
Lillian Hatcher (1915–1998), African American riveter and union organizer
Mickey Hatcher (born 1955), American baseball player
Ragen Hatcher, American politician
Richard G. Hatcher (1933–2019), American politician and lawyer
Teri Hatcher (born 1964), American actress
Wiley Ward Hatcher (1828–???), American politician in Wisconsin
William S. Hatcher (1935–2005), mathematician and philosopher

See also

Places
Hatcher, Georgia, United States
Hatcher, Kentucky, United States
Hatchers, Virginia, United States